Peter Ramsden (9 May 1934 – 1 September 2002) was an English professional rugby league footballer who played in the 1950s and 1960s.

Background
Peter Ramsden was born in Huddersfield, West Riding of Yorkshire, England, and he died aged 68 in York, North Yorkshire, England.

Playing career

Challenge Cup Final appearances
Peter Ramsden played , broke his nose after six minutes, scored two tries, and won the Lance Todd Trophy in Huddersfield's 15-10 victory over St. Helens in the 1952–53 Challenge Cup Final during the 1952–53 season at Wembley Stadium, London  on Saturday 25 April 1953, in front of a crowd of 89,588, and played in the 6-12 defeat by Wakefield Trinity in the 1961–62 Challenge Cup Final during the 1961–62 season at Wembley Stadium, London on Saturday 12 May 1962, in front of a crowd of 81,263.

Lance Todd Trophy
Peter Ramsden is the youngest player ever to win the Lance Todd Trophy, aged 19 in the 1952–53 Challenge Cup Final during the 1952–53 season.

County Cup Final appearances
Peter Ramsden played right-, i.e. number 3, in the 18-8 victory over Batley in the 1952–53 Yorkshire County Cup Final during the 1952–53 season at Headingley Rugby Stadium, Leeds on Saturday 15 November 1952, and played  in the 15-8 victory over York in the 1957–58 Yorkshire County Cup Final during the 1957–58 season at Headingley Rugby Stadium, Leeds on Saturday 19 October 1957.

Testimonial match
Peter Ramsden's Testimonial match at Huddersfield took place in 1961.

References

External links

Search for "Ramsden" at rugbyleagueproject.org
Wakefield Win Cup 1962
Wembley - Rugby League Final (aka Huddersfield V St. Helens) 1953
Ray French selects his top 10 Challenge Cup Final shocks. No 10:, 1953, Huddersfield 15-10 St Helens

1934 births
2002 deaths
English rugby league players
Huddersfield Giants players
Lance Todd Trophy winners
Rugby league players from Huddersfield
Rugby league centres
Rugby league five-eighths
Rugby league locks
York Wasps players